"Nie daj się" is the third single released from Doda's first solo album, Diamond Bitch. It is a single from the re-issue of the album. The song became the biggest hit of her solo career.

The song won in the category Polish Summer Hit 2008 at the Sopot Hit Festival.

Doda performed the song live at the National Festival of Polish Song in Opole 2008, Sopot Top Trendy Festival 2008 and Sopot Hit Festival 2008. She also sang "Nie daj się" at the final concert of summer concert tour "Hity Na Czasie 2008" in Zabrze.

Music video 
The single's music video, directed by Anna Maliszewska, was filmed in Warsaw. The video premiered on July 9, 2008 on Plejada.pl.

2008 singles
Doda (singer) songs
2008 songs
Universal Music Group singles